I-1K (also referred to as INSAT-1000) is a satellite bus developed by the Indian Space Research Organisation (ISRO) and marketed by Antrix Corporation. The I-1K bus is designed to be compatible with lightweight geostationary satellites and is commonly used for meteorological satellites.

Design
 Its power systems can supply between 500 and 1000 watts.
 The average transponder life is 7 years which can be extended up to 12 years.

List of satellites launched using I-1K platform
Kalpana-1
GSAT-12
IRNSS series (1A  1B  1C  1D  1E  1F  1G  1H  1I)
Chandrayaan-1
Mars Orbiter Mission

See also

 Comparison of satellite buses

References

External links
 Antrix Corp. satellite subsystems

Satellite buses
Indian Space Research Organisation